Estafa de amor, is a Mexican telenovela produced by Televisa and originally transmitted by Telesistema Mexicano.

Cast 
 Maricruz Olivier - Mariana
 Enrique Lizalde - Gustavo
 Lorena Velázquez - Mayte
 Enrique Alvarez Félix - Daniel
 Miguel Manzano
 Carlos Riquelme
 Alicia Montoya
 Jorge Mondragón
 Julián Bravo
 Prudencia Grifell
 Mari Carmen González
 Reyes Bravo Mora

References

External links 

Mexican telenovelas
Televisa telenovelas
Spanish-language telenovelas
1968 telenovelas
1968 Mexican television series debuts
1968 Mexican television series endings